Voegele is the name of:

 Kate Voegele (born 1986), American singer-songwriter and actress
 Ralf T. Voegele (born 1963), German biologist at the University of Hohenheim
 Ferdinand Voegele (born February 12, 1896), German cryptanalyst responsible for Luftwaffe Signal Intelligence Service during World War II.

See also

 Vögele